Belding is a city in Ionia County in the U.S. state of Michigan, completely surrounded by Otisco Township, Michigan. The population was 5,757 at the 2010 census.

History 
In 1838, six years before John Green came to the area that later would bear his name, Levi Broas, Belding's first settler, arrived in the area. The community first was known as Broas Rapids, later Patterson Mills and even, during logging days, as Hog Wallow. The name Belding was chosen in 1871 to honor the Belding family.

Geography

Demographics

, the median income for a household in the city was $35,625, and the median income for a family was $44,813. Males had a median income of $39,280 versus $32,542 for females. The per capita income for the city was $16,899.  About 13.4% of families and 16.3% of the population were below the poverty line, including 19.3% of those under age 18 and 12.3% of those age 65 or over.

2010 census
As of the census of 2010, there were 5,757 people, 2,161 households, and 1,473 families residing in the city. The racial makeup of the city was 95.2% White, 0.3% African American, 0.5% Native American, 0.5% Asian, 0.1% Pacific Islander, 1.6% from other races, and 1.8% from two or more races. Hispanic or Latino of any race were 5.0% of the population.

There were 2,161 households, of which 38.6% had children under the age of 18 living with them, 46.6% were married couples living together, 15.5% had a female householder with no husband present, 6.0% had a male householder with no wife present, and 31.8% were non-families. 26.3% of all households were made up of individuals, and 10.8% had someone living alone who was 65 years of age or older. The average household size was 2.61 and the average family size was 3.12.

The median age in the city was 33.7 years. 28.7% of residents were under the age of 18; 9% were between the ages of 18 and 24; 26.9% were from 25 to 44; 22.7% were from 45 to 64; and 12.7% were 65 years of age or older. The gender makeup of the city was 47.6% male and 52.4% female.

Historical sites

Belding Museum at the Belrockton

The Belding Museum is located in the historic Belrockton at 108 Hanover Street. The Bel, as it is known by locals, is a designated Michigan Historical Site. Built in 1906, the Belrockton is the last remaining boarding house of the three provided by the Belding Brothers and Company for its single female workers. A major silk manufacturer during the late nineteenth and early twentieth centuries, the company employed hundreds of young women and earned Belding the title of "Silk City of the World". Providing accommodations for one hundred residents and staff, the Belrockton Dormitory, a Classical Revival-inspired building, was erected at a cost of thirty thousand dollars. Following the closing of the company's silk mills in 1935, the "Bel" served as a residential training center for the National Youth Administration. In 1943, the building became a recreation center. The city of Belding purchased the structure in 1950 to serve as a community center. In 1987 it became the home of the Belding Museum. The Belding Museum is still up and running, hosting numerous local events.

Alvah N. Belding Memorial Library

The Alvah N. Belding Memorial Library is located at 302 E. Main Street, Belding, Michigan.
Belding's first public library was organized in 1890 by a group of civic-minded women who were members of the Ladies Literary Club.  A meager collection of books, some from personal libraries and some purchased from funds raised through strawberry festivals, 25¢ suppers, and subscription drives, was housed in a room above a store on west Main Street. After the disastrous fire of 1893 swept Main Street, the burned out library was reinstalled in a room over Connell's Drug Store and then later, in an upper room at City Hall. In 1914, upon a suggestion of local businessman Byron Brown, Alvah N. Belding of the Belding & Bros. Company, Silk Manufacturers, decided to build and give a library to the City of Belding. On March 21, 1917, the Belding City Council accepted his offer and agreed to maintain the building in like beauty and form as a library for all time.

Education
Belding Area Schools operates public schools.

Gus Macker basketball tournament
Belding is also the home of the Gus Macker 3 on 3 basketball tournament. At its peak, Belding's population would swell to approximately 100,000 temporary 'residents' during Macker weekends.

Notable people 

 Marie Zeigler, player in the All-American Girls Professional Baseball League

References

External links
Belding official website

Cities in Ionia County, Michigan
Grand Rapids metropolitan area
Populated places established in 1838
1838 establishments in Michigan